
Gmina Marianowo is a rural gmina (administrative district) in Stargard County, West Pomeranian Voivodeship, in north-western Poland.

Villages
Gmina Marianowo contains the villages and settlements of Czarnkowo, Dalewo, Dzwonowo, Gogolewo, Kępy, Krzywiec, Mariankowo, Marianowo, Sulino, Trąbki, Trąbki Małe and Wiechowo.

Neighbouring gminas
Gmina Marianowo is bordered by the town of Stargard and by the gminas of Chociwel, Dobrzany, Stara Dąbrowa, Stargard and Suchań.

References
Polish official population figures 2006

Marianowo
Stargard County